The Devil Wears Prada is a musical based on the novel and film of the same name, with music by Elton John, lyrics by Shaina Taub and a book by Kate Wetherhead.

Background 
In 2015, it was reported that Broadway producer Kevin McCollum had signed a deal two years earlier with Fox to develop some of the films from its back catalog into musicals for the stage. Two he expressed particular interest in were Mrs. Doubtfire (1993) and The Devil Wears Prada. Early in 2017, McCollum announced that in partnership with Fox Stage Productions, he was developing a musical version of The Devil Wears Prada (based on both the film and the book). Sir Elton John and Shaina Taub would be writing the score and lyrics for the project with playwright Paul Rudnick, who had written some early scenes for the screenplay, writing the book and lyrics. McCollum did not say when he expected it to premiere but hoped it would eventually play on Broadway.

In July 2019, the show held its first industry-only presentation of the initial reading for the show. It featured Emily Skinner as Miranda, Krystina Alabado as Andy, Heléne Yorke as Emily and Mario Cantone as Nigel. There had been no announcement about future workshops or tryouts before the anticipated Broadway run. With Daniel Hoyos leading the company management team with Alexa BIshop and Bella Cordova.

Productions 
In September 2019, a premiere run was announced for July and August 2020 at the James M. Nederlander Theatre in Chicago. According to producer Kevin McCollum, it was important to director Anna D. Shapiro, artistic director of the Steppenwolf Theater Company, also located in Chicago, to have the show premiere there.

In December 2019, the Chicago production was postponed for a year to start in July 2021, to allow the creative team more time to work on the show. Beth Leavel was announced to play the role of Miranda Priestly, with Taylor Iman Jones in the role of Andy Sachs. In January 2021, producers announced that the show would be delayed another year to July 2022, due to the coronavirus pandemic.

The Chicago production played its first preview performance on July 19, 2022, and played a limited run through August 21. The run was billed as pre-Broadway and the cast included the previously announced Jones and Leavel, alongside Javier Muñoz as Nigel Owens, Christiana Cole as Lauren, Megan Masako Haley as Emily Charlton, Tiffany Mann as Kayla, and Michael Tacconi as Nate Angstrom. In a September 2022 interview with Zoe Ball, Sir Elton John stated the show was not ready for subsequent stagings, adding "It'll be ready in about another year."

Cast and characters

Critical reception
The production officially opened August 8 and received universally poor reviews.  In the New York Post, Johnny Oleksinski said the show was "alarmingly un-fun and sluggish".  Adding "Every song is lousy, and there is nothing here worth fixing."

The Chicago Tribune's Chris Jones lamented that the show needed "the addition of more wit and irreverence to Wetherhead’s book and Shaina Taub’s lyrics."  He also felt that Arianne Phillips' costumes lacked the cutting-edge of true fashion house designs, an idea shared by Steven Oxman of Variety.

Reviewers in The Washington Post, The New York Times and BroadwayWorld all agreed that the story had its moments, but overall lack the bite of the novel or film.

References

External links
Official site

2022 musicals
Musicals based on films
Musicals based on novels
Musicals by Elton John
Plays set in New York City